Aleksandar Berček (born 4 September 1950) is a Serbian actor. He performed in more than one hundred films since 1971. He graduated at the Academy for theater, film, radio and television. He was the director of the National Theatre in Belgrade from 21 January 1993 to 10 May 1997.

Awards 
 In 1980. got Golden Arena for his role in the film Misko  Ko to tamo peva .
 Award "Pavle Vuisic" which is given to the actor for Lifetime Achievement, is given 2001.
 Golden Ring for Lifetime Achievement for the year 2012.
 In 2021 he was awarded the Order of Karađorđe's Star.

Selected filmography

References

External links

1950 births
Living people
People from Irig, Serbia
Serbian male film actors
Yugoslav male film actors
20th-century Serbian male actors
21st-century Serbian male actors
Yugoslav male television actors
Serbian male television actors